This is the map and list of European countries by monthly average wage (annual divided by 12 months) gross and net income (after taxes) average wages for full-time employees in their local currency and in euros. The chart below reflects the average (mean) wage as reported by various data providers. The salary distribution is right-skewed, therefore more than 50% of people earn less than the average gross salary. Thus, the median figures provided further below might be more representative than averages.

These figures will shrink after income tax is applied. In certain countries, actual incomes may exceed those listed in the table due to the existence of grey economies. In some countries, social security, contributions for pensions, public schools, and health are included in these taxes.

Maps

Net average monthly salary
The countries and territories have a net average monthly salary of:

Gross average monthly salaries
The countries and territories on the map have gross average monthly salaries (taxable income) of:

Net average monthly salary (adjusted for living costs in PPP)
The countries and territories on the map have a net average monthly salary  (adjusted for living costs in PPP) of:

European and transcontinental countries by monthly average wage 
 
a Excluding social and private benefits

European countries by monthly median wage 
The median wage is the amount that divides the population into two equal groups: half the employees in a country earn above the median, and the other half below. The median is more representative of what a random chosen employee might earn than the mean value, which may be skewed upwards by economic inequality.

Average monthly gross wage (1998–2018)

Gross, net and PPS (2000–2018)

See also
List of countries by wealth per adult
List of European countries by minimum wage
List of countries by GDP (nominal) per capita
List of countries by GDP (PPP) per capita
European countries by electricity consumption per person
European countries by health expense per person
European countries by percentage of urban population
List of European countries by life expectancy
List of US states by minimum wage
List of U.S. states and territories by median wage and mean wage
List of American countries by average wage
List of Asian countries by average wage

References

External links
Salary Survey
Salary in Germany
Eurostat: Wages and labour costs
Eurostat: Minimum wages August 2011
FedEE;Pay in Europe 2010
Wages (statutory minimum, average monthly gross, net) and labour cost (2005) CE Europe
Wages and Taxes for the Average Joe in the EU 27 2009
Moldovans have lowest wages in Europe
UK Net Salary Calculator
Database Central Europe: wages in Central and Eastern Europe

Wage
 List
Europe